"Get Low" is a song by German DJ and record producer Zedd and English singer and songwriter Liam Payne. The song was written by Charles Hinshaw, Zedd, Tristan Landymore and Fabienne Holloway, with production handled by Zedd. It was released on 6 July 2017, through Interscope Records. It is also included on Payne's debut studio album LP1. As of September 2017, "Get Low" has moved around 61,800 digital copies in the United States according to Nielsen SoundScan.

Background
In an interview with Beats 1, Zedd described the song as his definition of a summer song, and has a "Drake-ish influenced sound"."We created a song that I would say is probably the most urban-ish influenced song I've ever done, it's insanely catchy and I feel like you're gonna hate it after a while because it's so catchy. I think it's a good balance between where he is going with his solo project and where I'm going with my own music, it's right in between."He described the collaboration similar to what he did with Alessia Cara for his previous single "Stay". "Without Liam, I might've never finished this song. He really pulled it towards a direction that I would not have, and I love where it is." On 3 July 2017, both artists confirmed the single's release date on social media. Alongside was the single's artwork, in which pink palm trees and a clear blue sky were featured.

Composition
"Get Low" is a quick-spaced tropical dance, club-pop song that contains light percussion and a lead tropical house synth line. Amid sexually-charged lyrics, Payne talks to a potential lover over "buoyant" synths on the chorus.

Critical reception
Writing for Billboard, Sadie Bell felt the song "takes you on a trip to paradise inspired by its house bass and fantastical production." Bell wrote that the track feels like "the soundtrack to a summer getaway," with Payne's "mature" pop performance and the song's "sultry" lyrics. Jon Blistein of Rolling Stone described the song as "sultry and snappy," and Entertainment Weeklys Nick Roman called it a "sizzling summer jam." Much's Allison Bowsher felt the duo has "a bona fide earworm on their hands," where Payne delivered sexually-charged lyrics "with attitude." Writing for Spin, Rob Arcand called it a "stomping summer house jam sure to conquer radio airwaves near-immediately" where Payne "croons with a steady swagger bigger than any of his work with One Direction." Erin Jensen for USA Today opined although the lyrics lack "depth," the "catchy summer anthem" has a "very danceable" beat, serving as a "perfect soundtrack for a day at the pool or a night at the club." Mike Neid of Idolator criticized the lack of "a drop or some heavier bass," while Joe Anderton of Digital Spy opined the tropical-pop vibe is "not exactly revolutionary."

Track listing

Remix
On September 22nd, in the same year, an official remix was released was released by DJ Kuuro. Another remix was released on Soundcloud in December by DJ Big Z.

Charts

Weekly charts

Year-end charts

Certifications

Release history

References

External links
 
 
 
 

2017 songs
2017 singles
Liam Payne songs
Zedd songs
Interscope Records singles
Tropical house songs
Songs written by Zedd